Francesco Rigon (born 7 January 1987) is an Italian lightweight rower. He won a gold medal at the 2011 World Rowing Championships in Bled with the lightweight men's quadruple scull.

References

1987 births
Living people
Italian male rowers
World Rowing Championships medalists for Italy